Alzada (also known as Stoneville and Telegraph Point) is a census-designated place in southern Carter County, Montana, United States. As of the 2010 census it had a population of 29. It is located at the intersection of U.S. Route 212 with Montana Secondary Highways 323 and 326, near the Wyoming and South Dakota borders. The Little Missouri River flows northwards to the west of the community. Alzada is in the Mountain Time Zone.

History
Alzada was first established in 1878, by 9th U.S. Infantry soldiers as Camp Devin, on the Deadwood, Dakota Territory to Fort Keogh, Montana Territory telegraph line. It was called the Little Missouri River Telegraph Station, and manned by soldiers of the 7th U.S. Cavalry. Then it was named Stoneville, after the local bartender Lou Stone. It served as a stagecoach stop between Deadwood and Miles City, Montana. It was the site of a gun battle in 1884 between local authorities and rustlers known as the Exelby gang. The town's name was changed from Stoneville in 1885, because of confusion with another similarly named community. The name "Alzada" came from an early settler named Laura Alzada Shelden. Later settlers of the area were largely homesteaders. 

In 1890, Private Peter Thompson, a 7th Cavalry survivor and recipient of the Medal of Honor for the Battle of the Little Bighorn, moved from Lead, Dakota Territory, with his brother William and homesteaded north of Alzada on the Little Missouri River at Nine Mile Creek.

Alzada was briefly in the news in September 1997, when a B-1 bomber crashed nearby.

Demographics

Climate
According to the Köppen Climate Classification system, Alzada has a semi-arid climate, abbreviated "BSk" on climate maps.

See also

 List of census-designated places in Montana

References

External links

Unincorporated communities in Carter County, Montana
Unincorporated communities in Montana
Census-designated places in Montana